Valmiera Municipality is one of the 35 municipalities established in Latvia in 2021, located approximately  west of the national capital Riga. Its first elected municipal council took office on 1 July 2021. Its seat is the city of Valmiera.

Geography

It is located in the northwestern part of the Vidzeme region in northern Latvia, on the border with Estonia. It borders Valka Municipality to the east, Smiltene Municipality to the southeast, Cēsis Municipality to the south, and Limbaži Municipality to the west. It also borders the Estonian counties of Pärnu to the northwest, Viljandi to the north, and Valga to the northeast.

The hill was sacred to the ancient Latgalians and home to the Soviet-era folk healer .

The major rivers in the municipality are:
the Gauja, whose course upstream of the city of Valmiera is protected by the Ziemeļgauja Protected Landscape Area, and downstream of Valmiera by Gauja National Park; and
the Salaca, which drains Lake Burtnieks, the largest lake in the municipality.

The northern part of the municipality lies within the North Vidzeme Biosphere Reserve.

History
In 2020, the Saeima approved reducing the number of municipal-level administrative divisions from 119 to 42. Valmiera Municipality was formed from the union of the city of Valmiera with Beverīna Municipality, Burtnieki Municipality, Kocēni Municipality, Mazsalaca Municipality, Naukšēni Municipality, Rūjiena Municipality, and Strenči Municipality. Except for Strenči Municipality, these units were the constituents of the former Valmiera District. Elections for Latvia's new municipal councils were held on 5 June 2021, and the new municipalities including Valmiera will go into effect on 1 July 2021.

Administration
As of 2021, there are 19 seats on the Valmiera municipal council.

The municipality is divided into the city of Valmiera, four towns and 26 parishes:

City
Valmiera
Towns
Mazsalaca
Rūjiena
Seda
Strenči
Parishes
Bērzaine Parish
Brenguļi Parish
Burtnieki Parish
Dikļi Parish
Ēvele Parish
Ipiķi Parish
Jeri Parish
Jērcēni Parish
Kauguri Parish
Kocēni Parish
Ķoņi Parish
Lode Parish
Matīši Parish
Mazsalaca Parish
Naukšēni Parish
Plāņi Parish
Ramata Parish
Rencēni Parish
Sēļi Parish
Skaņkalne Parish
Trikāta Parish
Vaidava Parish
Vecate Parish
Vecpils Parish
Vilpulka Parish
Zilaiskalns Parish

Demographics
Valmiera is Latvia's second most populous municipality behind Ogre Municipality. The Central Statistical Bureau of Latvia estimated a population of 51,370 living in what is now Valmiera Municipality at the beginning of 2021. This represented a 24% decrease from an estimated population of 67,433 at the beginning of 2000, and a 11% decrease from an estimated population of 57,854 at the beginning of 2011.

The city of Valmieras had an estimated population of 22,971 at the beginning of 2021.

Economy and infrastructure
In 2018, the city of Valmiera recorded a gross domestic product per capita of €16,918, second highest among Latvian cities behind Riga. It is a regional centre for manufacturing and education. Vidzeme University of Applied Sciences is located in Valmiera.

Valmiera Municipality is crossed by national road A3 and the Riga–Lugaži Railway, which serve to connect the municipality with Riga to the southwest and with Valka on the Estonian border to the northeast.

References

 
Municipalities of Latvia
2021 establishments in Latvia
States and territories established in 2021
Vidzeme